Labeo nigrescens is a species of freshwater fish belonging to the genus Labeo. It is endemic to Karnataka in India. It is sometimes considered conspecific with Labeo calbasu.

References

nigrescens
Fish described in 1870